is a town located in Nishimatsuura District, Saga Prefecture, Japan. It is known for producing Arita porcelain, one of the traditional handicrafts of Japan. It also holds the largest ceramic fair in Western Japan, the Arita Ceramic Fair. This event is held from April 29 to May 5 (Golden Week) every year and has thousands of stores and stalls lining the six-kilometre long main street.

On March 1, 2006 the town of Nishiarita, from Nishimatsuura District, was merged into Arita.

Geography
Arita is located in the western part of Saga Prefecture, bordering Nagasaki Prefecture from its southwest to western sides. About 70% of the town is forest and mountains.

Neighbouring municipalities
Saga Prefecture
Imari
Takeo

History
Arita was one of the first sites in Japan to produce porcelain, Arita ware. The discovery of porcelain stone is attributed to a Korean potter named Kanagae Sambe, although most historians consider this a legend.

April 1, 1889 – The modern municipal system is established. In accordance with this system the village of Sarayama is renamed and reclassified as the town of Arita. Also at this time the villages of Shin, Magarikawa and Ōyama are formed.
November 13, 1896 – The village of Shin is renamed Arita.
January 1, 1947 – The village of Arita becomes a town and is renamed Higashi-Arita.
April 1, 1954 – Higashi-Arita is incorporated into Arita.
April 1, 1955 – Magarikawa and Ōyama merge to form the village of Nishi-Arita.
January 1, 1956 – Several areas of Nishi-Arita are incorporated into Arita.
April 1, 1965 – Nishi-Arita becomes a town.
March 1, 2006 – Nishi-Arita is incorporated into Arita.

Demography
According to Japanese census data, this is the population of Arita in recent years.

Twin towns – sister cities

Arita is twinned with:
 Meissen, Germany

Friendship city
 Jingdezhen, China

Education

Prefectural high schools
Arita Technical High School

Municipal junior high schools
Arita Junior High School
Nishi-Arita Junior High School

Municipal elementary schools
Arita Elementary School
Arita Chūbu Elementary School
Magarikawa Elementary School
Ōyama Elementary School

Other schools
Arita College of Ceramics

Transportation

Air
There is no airport in Arita. The closest airports are Saga Airport and Nagasaki Airport.

Rail

Main station: Arita Station
JR Kyushu, Sasebo Line: (To Takeo) – Kami-Arita – Arita – (To Sasebo)
Matsuura Railway, Nishi-Kyūshū Line: Arita – Midaibashi – Kurogō – Zōshuku – Nishi-Arita – Ōgi – Yamadani – Meotoishi – (To Imari)

Road
National highways
National route 35
National route 202
National route 498

Sightseeing

The Kyushu Ceramic Museum houses large exhibits of old and modern style ceramics.
The Porcelain Park is a ceramic centered theme park, and is modeled on the Zwinger Palace in Germany. Ceramic ware from the heyday of Arita are on display in the gallery. 
Arita Kan (有田館) has an exhibition of modern art porcelain, 400 different cups for coffee or tea and a theatre with computerized puppets made of porcelain.
"China On The Park" dates back to the end of the last century when the Fukugawa factory was chosen to provide the Imperial household with porcelain. This large and modern style facility contains a factory, galleries, shops and a restaurant.
Tozan Shrine has a porcelain archway and other items of porcelain which, at other shrines, are usually made of stone. This shrine was and still is particularly revered by Arita's ceramists.
Rokuroza (ろくろ座), located near Kami-Arita Station, is a place where one can learn how to make pottery.

Pottery

 Kakiemon
 Imari porcelain
 Nabeshima ware, from Okawachi, near Arita

Notable people from Arita
 Kakiemon Sakaeda, The 1st Kakiemon
 Sakaida Kakiemon XIV, who is a Living National Treasure in Japan
 Imaizumi Imaemon XIII, who is a Living National Treasure in Japan
 Tsuji Hitachi
 Ryuzan Aoki
 Manji Inoue, who is a Living National Treasure in Japan

See also
 Japanese pottery
 Yi Sam Pyong (Yi Sam-p'young; 1579–1655)
 Hakuji
 Karatsu ware – Produced in Saga. The most produced pottery in western Japan. Believed to have started in the 16th century. Greatly influenced by Korean potters.
 Okawachiyama  (see Nabeshima on Wikipedia France)

References

External links

 Arita official website 

Towns in Saga Prefecture